The 2021 Washington Justice season will be the third season of Washington Justice's existence in the Overwatch League and the team's first full season under head coach Han "Sup7eme" Seung-jun, after he took over the position midway through their 2020 season.

Preceding offseason

Roster changes 

The Justice entered free agency with five free agents, all of which became free agents due to the Justice not exercising the option to retain the player for another year.

Acquisitions 
The Justice's first offseason acquisition was Kim "Mag" Tae-sung, a rookie tank player coming from Overwatch Contenders Korea team RunAway, on October 24, 2020. Next, they signed Min "Jerry" Tae-hee, a hitscan damage player coming off a season with the Boston Uprising in which he had "bright moments throughout," who signed on November 9. Ten days later, the Justice signed Yoon "Bebe" Hee-chang, a support player who is an "expert Zenyatta and reliable Ana player." The following day, the team signed veteran Jung "Closer" Won-sik, a "very capable" support player who played with the Dallas Fuel in 2020. The next day, November 21, Washington signed Kim "Fury" Jun-ho, a veteran support player coming off of a top-four finish with the Philadelphia Fusion last season. The Justice's final acquisition in November came the following day with the signing of Park "Ria" Sung-wook, a tank player coming off an "impressive playoffs performance" with the Hangzhou Spark. The team's final offseason signing came in February; on February 14, 2021, they signed Kim "Assassin" Sung-won, a rookie damage player coming off of a third-place finish at Overwatch Contenders' The Gauntlet: Asia with team RunAway.

Departures 
Four of the Justice's five free agents did not return. Damage player Lee "Stitch" Chung-hee, tank player Choi "Jjanu" Hyun-woo, and support player Kwon "Aimgod" Min-seok	did not sign with a team in the offseason, while support player Hong "Ark" Yeon-jun announced his retirement in the offseason. Outside of their free agents, the Justice released tank player Gye "Roar" Chang-hoon on October 22, 2020.

Final roster

Transactions 
Transactions of/for players on the roster during the 2021 regular season:
On May 12, tank player Park "Ria" Seong-wook retired.

Standings

Game log

Regular season 

|2021 season schedule

Postseason

References 

Washington Justice
Washington Justice
Washington Justice seasons